This is a list of Major Air Command (MAJCOM) Wings of the United States Air Force (USAF), a designation system in use from the summer of 1948 to the mid-1990s.  From 1948 to 1991 MAJCOMs had the authority to form wings using manpower authorizations under their control.  Each MAJCOM or other organization reporting directly to USAF was assigned a block of four digit numbers to use for units it organized.  The system terminated in 1991 when USAF assumed control of all units except for provisional ones.

While the majority of the wings on the list were support units, combat commands could (and did) create combat units on their own as shown below.

Background

Army Air Force Base Units
In 1944, The Army Air Forces (AAF) faced a problem with its units in the United States.  At the time, most AAF units were involved with training and preparing individuals and units for deployment to combat theaters or with meeting the logistics requirements of overseas units. Standard military units, based on relatively inflexible tables of organization, were proving to be poorly adapted to this mission. Accordingly, the AAF adopted a more functional system in which each base was organized into a separate numbered unit. Under this system, each command reporting to the AAF was given a bulk allotment of manpower and then received the flexibility to form units to carry out its mission by "customizing" the units on each station.  AAF commands then organized their manpower into numbered "AAF Base Units."  To prevent duplication, commands were allotted blocks of numbers to use when organizing their units, ranging from 100-199 for First Air Force to 4000-4999 for Air Technical Service Command.  When the United States Air Force (USAF) became a separate service, the AAF Base Units became AF Base Units.

Wing Base Organization
In August 1947, the AAF began a service test of the wing base organization model. This test was limited to combat wings, and unified the combat group and all support elements on a base under a single wing, which carried the same number as the combat group. The test proved the wing base plan to the satisfaction of the new USAF and was implemented in all combat commands in the summer of 1948. The success of the plan also led to its implementation in support commands and the support units of combat commands as well. Beginning in the late spring of 1948 AF Base Units were replaced by wings, groups, and squadrons. By July 1948 Headquarters, USAF began to allot blocks of numbers to its major subordinate formations, the Major Commands (MAJCOMs), in the same way that it had allotted blocks for AF Base Units.  Because the new units controlled by MAJCOMs would be wings, groups, and squadrons, just like those controlled by Headquarters, USAF, the allotted blocks began at 1100, and numbers below 1000 were reserved for USAF use.  Numbers originally ranged from 1100-1199 for Bolling Field Command to 4900-4999 for Special Weapons Command.  Eventually, the numbers were expanded as high as 9999 for Continental Air Command reserve units.

MAJCOM wings
The term used by USAF to denote wings (and other units) controlled by MAJCOMs varied during the first decade the system was used.  Originally, they were called Table of Distribution (T/D) Units. Later they were referred to as Designated Units. From the late 1950s the accepted term was MAJCON (from Major Command Controlled) Units, while units controlled by Hq USAF were called AFCON (Air Force Controlled) Units. All provisional units were MAJCON units. Although Headquarters, USAF occasionally authorized MAJCOMs to number provisional wings outside the blocks of numbers allotted to the commands, only four digit provisional wings are included in this list.  Provisional wings numbered outside the four digit system, such as the Strategic Wing, Provisional 72d at Andersen AFB during the Viet Nam War or the Bombardment Wing, Provisional, 806th at RAF Fairford during Operation Desert Storm are not included in the list.

Under the USAF organization and lineage system MAJCON units' lineages (histories, awards, and battle honors) ended when the units were discontinued and could never be revived. USAF considered MAJCON wings "temporary", though many stayed in existence for a very long time. Some MAJCON wings appear to have been revived, but even when they have the same number and name, USAF regards them as two entirely separate units, as shown in the two entries for the 1500th Air Base Wing in the list.

Although USAF policy during this era stated MAJCON units could not be reactivated, when the MAJCON system was being ended in 1991–1992, numerous MAJCON units were converted to AFCON units and assigned two or three digit numbers. Also, since 1991 discontinued MAJCON units have been reestablished and "consolidated" (merged) with AFCON units. Other former MAJCON units have been revived as AFCON units.

Conversion of MAJCON Wings to AFCON Wings

During the period covered by this list, there were several occasions when Major Commands received approval from the Department of the Air Force to replace MAJCON Wings under their control with AFCON Wings. One reason for these changes was to retain the lineage of existing combat units or to revive and perpetuate the lineage of inactive units with illustrious combat records.  In 1963 SAC discontinued its Air Refueling Wings and Strategic Wings equipped with combat aircraft and replaced them with AFCON units. ADC had acted similarly in 1955 with Project Arrow, which was designed to bring back on the active list fighter units which had compiled memorable records in the two world wars, although Project Arrow involved groups and squadrons, not wings.

On occasion, Hq, USAF provided that an AFCON Wing replacing a MAJCON Wing inherited the honors, but not the history, of the wing being replaced.  For example, when the 320th Bombardment Wing and the 456th Strategic Aerospace Wing replaced the 4134th Strategic Wing and the 4126th Strategic Wing in 1963, they inherited honors (not lineage) from the MAJCON wings they replaced. This inheritance occurred because SAC was aware of the historical significance of the accomplishments of the Strategic Wings and the need to perpetuate this lineage as well as the lineage of illustrious units that were no longer active. In practice, this inheritance of honors has been limited to the adoption of emblems.  While the 320th decided to use the emblem approved for it earlier, the 456th chose to replace the emblem approved for it when it was a troop carrier wing with the emblem of the 4126th.

FEAF Tactical Support Wings

In July 1950, USAF planners did not foresee that the Korean War would be of long duration.  Consequently, when it came time for Far East Air Forces to deploy tactical units to Korea, it retained its permanent wings in Japan since they were heavily committed to the air defense of Japan. However, by the following month, it became apparent that the Air Base Squadrons originally deployed to Korea to support tactical units did not have sufficient personnel and equipment.  Therefore, five Tactical Support Wings were organized for operational control of the tactical groups in Korea. This proved a temporary expedient, and at the start of December 1950 the permanent wings were deployed to Korea to control their tactical groups already located there, replacing the existing Tactical Support Wings.

SAC Strategic and Air Refueling Wings

When the Boeing B-52 Stratofortress dispersal program began in the late 1950s, the new SAC units created to support this program were MAJCON Strategic Wings and given four-digit designations.  Although these wings were MAJCON units, typically each included a Bombardment Squadron, an Air Refueling Squadron, and a Munitions Maintenance Squadron, all of which were AFCON units.  Some also included an AFCON Strategic Missile Squadron. SAC also used the strategic wing concept for the command of forward-deployed (Operation Reflex) Boeing B-47 Stratojet and Boeing KC-97 Stratofreighter units.  SAC also had several MAJCON air refueling wings whose flying squadrons were AFCON units.

The reorganization process, which took place between January and September 1963, applied to 22 B-52 Strategic Wings, three Air Refueling Wings, and the 4321st Strategic Wing at Offutt Air Force Base, Nebraska, which had a strategic missile squadron assigned. "These units were discontinued and two and three-digit AFCON units were activated. In most cases, the bombardment squadron[s] that had been assigned to the strategic wings were inactivated and bombardment squadrons that had previously been assigned to the newly-activated wings were activated. While these actions were almost tantamount to redesignation, they were not official redesignations." Overseas strategic wings, which had AFCON units attached for operational control, but not assigned, did not convert to AFCON wings until 1966.

MATS Air Transport Wings

When the MAJCON system was established in 1948 strategic airlift and tactical airlift were treated differently.  Tactical airlift (called troop carrier) units operated within a theater of operations and were considered AFCON combat units.  Strategic airlift (called air transport) units operated mostly outside theaters of operations and were considered support units.  As support units, they were MAJCON units.  All air transport wings were assigned to Military Air Transport Service (MATS) and numbered within the block of 1250 to 1750.  In 1952, however, MATS MAJCON air transport squadrons were replaced by AFCON Squadrons,. By being MAJCON wings with AFCON squadrons assigned, MATS air transport wings resembled SAC strategic wings.  In January 1966, MATS was replaced by Military Airlift Command and its seven existing MAJCON Air Transport Wings were replaced by AFCON Military Airlift Wings.

Flying Training Wings

The Air Force considered all training units support units.  Although they were assigned the mission of advanced training, combat crew training wings operated the same kinds of aircraft as combat wings and retained a capability to augment combat forces. SAC's 93d Bombardment Wing and MAC's 443d Military Airlift Wing were AFCON units conducting the same crew training mission for bombardment, air refueling, and airlift. In October 1969, Tactical Air Command (TAC) joined them and replaced its MAJCON combat crew training wings for fighter and reconnaissance aircraft with AFCON fighter training wings.

The final conversion of MAJCON to AFCON wings occurred between 1972 and 1973. The remaining MAJCON flying training units in the Air Force were assigned to Air Training Command (ATC).  ATC followed TAC's example and replaced its MAJCON pilot training wings and navigator training wing with AFCON flying training wings.

End of the MAJCOM system
During the Gulf War of 1990-91 MAJCON wings, such as the 7440th Composite Wing (Provisional) at Incirlik Air Base, Turkey, and the 801st Bomb Wing (Provisional) at Morón Air Base, Spain served alongside AFCON wings.  The MAJCON system was in existence up until 30 April 1991, when all units became AFCON units.  A number of MAJCOM wings were converted to AFCON status while retaining their four digit designation or redesignated with one to three digits.

"At the same time, the Air Force withdrew the authorization for major commands to create MAJCON organizations. Those four digit organizations active on 30 April 1991, changed to organizations under the direct control of Headquarters USAF for organizational actions, eliminating all MAJCON organizations. Among the former MAJCON organizations were about twenty active four-digit wings. Within a few years, however all those wings were inactivated, consolidated with, or replaced by lower numbered wings." An example is the 4404th Wing in Saudi Arabia, which was only replaced by a three-digit AFCON wing, the 363d Air Expeditionary Wing, on 1 December 1998.

Four digit wings are still permitted if they are provisional organizations, although the wing number is based on the unit's area of responsibility, not the command it is assigned to. However, most USAF provisional units are now expeditionary units.  Although expeditionary wings are activated as needed by MAJCOMs, their numbers are controlled by Hq, USAF and their lineage and honors can be inherited.

List of MAJCOM Wings

Abbreviations: ABG=Air Base Group, ABW=Air Base Wing, CCTW=Combat Crew Training Wing, CSG=Combat Support Group, TFW=Tactical Fighter Wing, TTG=Technical Training Group

See also
List of USAF Provisional Wings assigned to Strategic Air Command
List of USAF Strategic Wings assigned to the Strategic Air Command

References

Notes
 Explanatory notes

 Citations

Bibliography

 Buss, Lydus H.(ed), Sturm, Thomas A., Volan, Denys, and McMullen, Richard F., History of Continental Air Defense Command and Air Defense Command July to December 1955, Directorate of Historical Services, Air Defense Command, Ent AFB, CO, (1956)
 
 
 
 
 
 
 
 
  (An updated, but abbreviated version of this work is available at A Guide to USAF Lineage and Honors)
 
 "The Four Digit Wings", article in a British aviation periodical, probably Aviation News, 1990-93 period (exact date not known)
 USAF Directories
 SS-OL1 Directory of United States Air Force Organizations 31 October 1962 (Declassified from Secret - 17 January 2006) Document is on file at the United States National Archives.
 Air Force Manual 10-4, Directory of Air Force Addresses, 1 November 1973, Vol. I (Unclassified), Department of the Air Force, Washington, DC
 Air Force Manual 10-4, Directory of Air Force Addresses, 15 May 1976, Vol. I (Unclassified), Department of the Air Force, Washington, DC
 Air Force Manual 10-4, Directory of Air Force Addresses, 1 September 1978, Vol. I (Unclassified), Department of the Air Force, Washington, DC
 Air Force Regulation 4-16, Air Force Address Directory, 1 March 1989, Department of the Air Force, Washington, DC
  (through 317th Maintenance Squadron)
  (from 317th Motor Vehicle Squadron)
 
  (renumbered AF Pamphlet 36-2801)

External links
 
 
 
  Access to this site has been limited due to attempted spamming
 

 
Lists of United States Air Force units and formations